The Crazies may refer to:
insanity, or the insane
The Crazies (1973 film), a science fiction horror film about a biological weapon's effects on a small town
The Crazies (2010 film), a remake of the 1973 film

See also 

Crazy (disambiguation)